The Fortress Rocks are a cluster of low rock summits  north of the summit of Observation Hill on Hut Point Peninsula, Ross Island. The descriptive name was given by members of the British Antarctic Expedition, 1910–13, under Robert Falcon Scott.

References 

Rock formations of the Ross Dependency
Landforms of Ross Island